Angela Mitchell (née Evans; born 14 September 1977 in Christchurch, New Zealand) is a New Zealand netball player. Mitchell played domestic netball in the National Bank Cup (NBC) for the Canterbury Flames (1998–2002) and the Otago Rebels (2003–2005, 2007). She retired in 2008 when the NBC was replaced by the ANZ Championship, but came out of retirement to return to the Canterbury Tactix as a shooter for the 2009 season. mitchell also played five tests for the New Zealand national team, the Silver Ferns, from 2001 to 2004, making her on-court debut against Jamaica in 2002.

References

2009 ANZ Championship profile. Retrieved 2009-04-11.

1977 births
Living people
New Zealand netball players
Mainland Tactix players
ANZ Championship players
Otago Rebels players
Canterbury Flames players